The 1976 Kansas City Chiefs season was the franchise's seventh season in the National Football League, the fourteenth as the Kansas City Chiefs, and the seventeenth overall. It ended with a third consecutive 5–9 record and the Chiefs missed the playoffs for the fifth consecutive season.

Buck Buchanan announced his retirement in February, while Len Dawson announced his own departure on May 1. Off the field, Jack Steadman was promoted to team president and Jim Schaaf was named general manager in August. On the field, Kansas City's fortunes didn't improve in the second year of the Wiggin regime. The club dropped three straight home games, including an embarrassing 27–17 loss in Week 3 to the New Orleans Saints, the first win with the Saints for former Kansas City coach Hank Stram (who refused to shake hands with Wiggin following the game and rode off on the shoulders of his players as he did after the Chiefs' victory in Super Bowl IV) before suffering a 50–17 setback at Buffalo on October 3, opening the season at 0–4 for the first time in team history. The team registered a 3–1 record during a successful midseason stretch, but like most preceding seasons, could not maintain that momentum.

After lingering in Len Dawson's shadow for eight seasons, Mike Livingston was firmly entrenched as the team's starting quarterback, becoming the first QB to start every regular season game since Dawson in 1968. Although Livingston played well and rallied the squad for wins in two of the season's final three games, the Chiefs still ended the year with their third consecutive 5–9 record. Running back MacArthur Lane was the club's top offensive threat, becoming the only player at the time in franchise history to lead the league in receptions (66).

Offseason

NFL Draft

Roster

Schedule

Preseason

Regular season

Standings

Game summaries

Week 1: vs. San Diego Chargers

Week 2: vs. Oakland Raiders

Week 3: vs. New Orleans Saints

Week 4: at Buffalo Bills

Week 5: at Washington Redskins

Week 6: at Miami Dolphins

Week 7: vs. Denver Broncos

Week 8: at Tampa Bay Buccaneers

Week 9: vs. Pittsburgh Steelers

Week 10: at Oakland Raiders

Week 11: vs. Cincinnati Bengals

Week 12: at San Diego Chargers

Week 13: at Denver Broncos

Week 14: vs. Cleveland Browns

References

Kansas City Chiefs
Kansas City Chiefs seasons
Kansas